Jürgen Barth (born 10 December 1947 in Thum, Saxony) is a German former racecar driver. He is the son of Formula One driver and sports car racer Edgar Barth.

Barth started out as an engineer but became one of the most successful drivers in sports car racing. He won the Le Mans 24 Hours in 1977 in a Porsche 936, with Jacky Ickx and Hurley Haywood, and in 1980 he won the 1000 km Nürburgring with Rolf Stommelen.

Barth is co-author of the book about Porsche's racing history, Das große Buch der Porschetypen, and later would help in the creation of the BPR Global GT Series.

24 Hours of Le Mans results

See also
 Louis Meznarie

External links

1947 births
Living people
People from Thum
Racing drivers from Saxony
German racing drivers
24 Hours of Le Mans drivers
24 Hours of Le Mans winning drivers
World Sportscar Championship drivers
ADAC GT Masters drivers
Porsche Motorsports drivers
Team Joest drivers
Larbre Compétition drivers